Groß Gerau station is located approximately 500 metres north of the centre of the town of Groß-Gerau in the German state of Hesse on the Rhine-Main Railway, running from  Wiesbaden and Mainz to Darmstadt and Aschaffenburg. A curve branches off near the station connecting to the nearby Groß-Gerau-Dornberg station on the Mannheim–Frankfurt railway. The station is classified by Deutsche Bahn as a category 5 station.  The station name has no hyphen unlike the town it is in, following a Prussian government order of 1910, which applied because of Prussian finance for the line, even though the station was in the Grand Duchy of Hesse.

History

The station was opened with the section of the Rhine-Main Railway between Mainspitze and Darmstadt opened by the Hessian Ludwig Railway (Hessische Ludwigsbahn) in 1858. In Groß-Gerau, a wooden hut served as the station building. A new station building was opened in 1868. During the First World War, a volunteer ambulance corps and a branch of the Red Cross run by the ladies of the Alice-Hospital (founded by Princess Alice, Queen Victoria’s daughter) operated in the station building. In 1944, the station building was destroyed in an air raid and it was rebuilt in 1957. The station building is now recognised as an historic landmark under the Hessian Heritage Act.

Infrastructure
The station has three platform tracks, comprising the “home” platform beside the station building and an island platform. To the east there are freight sidings and a freight siding to a nearby enterprise. To the west there is a connection to a former site of the sugar manufacturer Südzucker, which operated an extensive system of tracks. Since 1970, the rail traffic has been controlled by a relay interlocking.

Rail services
The station is served by the Regionalbahn service RB 75, running every hour (during peak hours every 30 minutes) from Wiesbaden via Mainz to Groß Gerau and continuing through Darmstadt to Aschaffenburg.

Notes

References

External links

Railway stations in Hesse
Railway stations in Germany opened in 1858
Buildings and structures in Groß-Gerau (district)